Clarksburg is an unincorporated community located within Millstone Township in Monmouth County, New Jersey, United States. The area is served as United States Postal Service ZIP code 08510.

As of the 2000 United States Census, the population for ZIP Code Tabulation Area 08510 was 2,128.

Clarksburg is located 187 feet (57 m) above sea level.

Historic sites
Clarksburg Methodist Episcopal Church (added in 1999 as Building #99000084) and Clarksburg School (also added in 1999, as Building #99001316) are listed on the National Register of Historic Places.

Notable people

People who were born in, residents of, or otherwise closely associated with Clarksburg include:
 J. R. Smith (born 1985), National Basketball Association player with the Cleveland Cavaliers.
 Darrin Winston (1966–2008), Major League Baseball player who played two seasons for the Philadelphia Phillies.

Nearby historic communities
 Adelphia in Howell Township
 The Cassville Crossroads Historic District in Jackson Township
 Cookstown in North Hanover Township
 Dutch Neck in West Windsor Township
 Imlaystown in Upper Freehold Township
 Jerseyville in Howell Township
 Lawrenceville in Lawrence Township (Mercer County)
 Leisure Village West in Manchester Township
 Marlboro in Marlboro Township
 Monmouth Junction in South Brunswick
 The Monmouth Battlefield Historic District in Freehold Township and Manalapan Township
 Kingston in Franklin Township and South Brunswick
 New Egypt in Plumsted Township
 Old Bridge in East Brunswick
 Perrineville in Millstone Township
 Plainsboro Center in Plainsboro Township
 The Princeton Battlefield Historic District in Princeton
 Princeton Junction in West Windsor Township
 Tennent in Manalapan Township
 West Freehold in Freehold Township

References

Millstone Township, New Jersey
Unincorporated communities in Monmouth County, New Jersey
Unincorporated communities in New Jersey